Hong Kong SkyCity is a large business and entertainment complex adjacent to Hong Kong International Airport, and is built on land owned by the Airport Authority Hong Kong. It currently includes the AsiaWorld–Expo, Terminal 2 (SkyPlaza) and SkyPier.

Facilities

AsiaWorld–Expo

AsiaWorld–Expo  is the largest column free, and perhaps largest, exhibition centre in Hong Kong, boasting over 70,000 cubic meters of space. It plays host to numerous trade shows, meetings, and concerts (at the adjacent AsiaWorld–Arena). It is directly connected to the Airport Express.

SkyPier
This complex allows passengers from Mainland China and Macau to access Hong Kong International Airport by jetfoil or ferry. It is connected via automated people mover that transport passengers to the Airport for connecting flights and vice versa. Architecture firm Aedas designed SkyPier.

Hong Kong Skycity Marriott Hotel
This luxury hotel connects to AsiaWorld Expo, the SkyPier & Nine eagle golf course.  of total meeting space can accommodate up to 650 guests. The 658-room hotel was opened in December 2008. The hotel was the first hotel in Hong Kong to receive the halal food certification.

Under development

SkyPlaza
SkyPlaza is a large entertainment and retail centre that would be housed in Terminal 2 of the Hong Kong International Airport. The check-in facilities of Terminal 2 opened on 28 February 2007 along with the opening of Platform 3 of the Airport Express Airport station.

Airport World Trade Centre
It would include the Airport World Trade Centre, which would house numerous offices.

11 Skies
Airport Authority Hong Kong announced on 2 May 2018 that New World Development has been awarded the tender for the SKYCITY integrated development which comprises retail complexes, dining areas, hotels, entertainment facilities and offices. Under the agreement, New World Development will design, construct, finance and manage the development on sites A2 and A3, adjacent to HKIA's passenger terminals. 

New World Development has announced on 23 November 2020 the official name of the project – 11 Skies – operated by K11 under the New World Development's portfolio. Scheduled to open in phases from 2022 to 2025, the 3.8-million-square-foot complex will contain 2.66 million sq. ft. dining and retail space, 570,000 sq. ft. experiential entertainment facilities and 570,000 sq. ft. grade A office space. There will be over 800 shops including more than 120 restaurants.

Former elements

Golf course
The SkyCity Nine Eagles Golf Course was a nine-hole golfing facility. It had seven Par 3 holes and two Par 4 holes set amidst rolling terrain, undulating greens and extensive bunkering. The Skycity Nine Eagles Golf Course closed down on 30 July 2015. The Airport Authority said the site, part of the airport's north commercial district, would be used to accommodate a hotel with some 1,000 rooms, and retail development of some 200,000 square metres.

Transportation

From airport

Shuttle buses are the current options of getting around SkyCity without driving a car.

Airport Express, part of the MTR's Airport Express line, takes only a minute to travel between AsiaWorld–Expo and the Airport. It costs HK$2.5 for Octopus users and HK$5 for others.

Automated People Mover is the current People mover in use at the airport and only operates within the terminal. After completion of SkyCity, the Hong Kong International Airport Automated People Mover will be extended to include Terminal 2 (SkyPlaza) and SkyPier.

From other areas of Hong Kong
Because SkyCity is located at Chek Lap Kok, the island Hong Kong International Airport is on, it is easy to reach from other areas of the territory.

The Airport Express can be taken from Kowloon, Hong Kong, and Tsing Yi stations. In addition, the Tung Chung line can be taken from Tung Chung to the same stations (plus others) via buses to Tung Chung at a cheaper price than the Airport Express.

The buses that serve the Airport are also options, including the A21 from Hung Hom in Kowloon, which travels to both the Airport and the AsiaWorld-Expo.

The common taxis that service Kowloon, Hong Kong, and Lantau are the easiest but also perhaps the most expensive way to get to SkyCity.

See also
List of shopping centres in Hong Kong

References

External links

  
 Hong Kong SkyCity Marriott Hotel 

Shopping centres in Hong Kong
Marriott hotels
Hotels in Hong Kong
Chek Lap Kok
Hong Kong International Airport